Eduard Arnover (15 December 1899 Lellapere (now Kehtna Parish), Kreis Harrien, Governorate of Estonia – 26 August 1942 Syktyvkar, Komi ASSR) was an Estonian politician. He was a member of VI Riigikogu (its Chamber of Deputies).

References

1899 births
1942 deaths
People from Kehtna Parish
People from Kreis Harrien
Members of the Estonian National Assembly
Members of the Riigivolikogu
Recipients of the Military Order of the Cross of the Eagle
Estonian people who died in Soviet detention
People who died in the Gulag